Tallinna FC Castovanni Eagles is an Estonian football club based in Tallinn. Founded in 2010, they currently play in the III Liiga, the fifth tier of Estonian football. Tallinna FC Soccernet is their reserve team.

Players

Current squad
 ''As of 24 July 2017.

Statistics

League and Cup

References

Football clubs in Tallinn
Association football clubs established in 2010